The initials SCF (or scf) may refer to:

Associations and organizations
Saba Conservation Foundation
Sahara Conservation Fund
Scientific Committee on Food
Scheduled Castes Federation, a political party in India
Singapore Chess Federation
Singapore Canoe Federation
Société Chimique de France (Chemical Society of France)
Save the Children Fund
Svenska Cykelförbundet

In science and technology
Self-consistent field, an approach used in Hartree–Fock  methods in quantum systems
Service Control Function in a telecommunications network
Small carbonaceous fossil
SCF-complex (Skp1/Cul1/F-box complex), a ubiquitin ligase
Supercritical fluid
Standard cubic foot of gas
Stem cell factor a cytokine.
Switched Capacitor Filter

Other
Stechford railway station, West Midlands, station code
Salem Cricket Foundation Stadium
Sectional center facility, United States Postal Service
South Central Farm
Southern Cathedrals Festival 
State College of Florida
Survey of Consumer Finances
Swift, Certain, Fair